Cuffy may refer to:

 Coffy (person) (often spelled Cuffy), an Akan slave in the Dutch colony of Berbice (present-day Guyana) who in 1763 led a revolt of more than 2,500 slaves
 Cuffy, Cher, a commune of the Cher département, in France
 Cuffy (TV series), a British sitcom from the early 1980s.
 Cuffy Meigs, a character in Atlas Shrugged
 Cuffy, California grizzly bear, nickname for any grizzly, especially the bear found on the Flag of California. Derived from a sound they are said to make.
See also:
William Cuffay